Ulvibacterium is a Gram-negative, aerobic, rod-shaped and non-motile genus of bacteria from the family of Flavobacteriaceae with one known species (Ulvibacterium marinum). Ulvibacterium marinum has been isolated from the alga Ulva prolifera.

References

Flavobacteria
Bacteria genera
Monotypic bacteria genera
Taxa described in 2021